Ocon or OCON may refer to:

 Ocón, La Rioja, Spain
 Esteban Ocon (born 1996), French racing driver
 Francesc Josep Catalán de Ocón, 18th-c. Bishop of Urgel
 Juan Alonso y Ocón (1597–1656), Catholic prelate
 OCON, the annual Objectivist conference organized by the Ayn Rand Institute